Ecphyadophoridae is a family of nematodes belonging to the order Rhabditida.

Genera:
 Ecphyadophora
 Lelenchus

References

Nematodes